Ruminations is the seventh solo studio album by American musician Conor Oberst, released on October 14, 2016 on Nonesuch Records. An expanded edition of the album featuring five bonus tracks was released on July 23, 2021.

Background
On October 28, 2015, in the midst of Desaparecidos' tour for their second studio album Payola, it was announced that Conor Oberst had been hospitalized due to "laryngitis, anxiety, and exhaustion," according to a press release. The entirety of Desaparecidos' remaining tour dates were cancelled and Oberst returned to his hometown of Omaha to recuperate. Oberst spent the following months in Omaha, where he wrote and recorded the songs that make up Ruminations.

Recording
The album was recorded in February of 2016 at ARC Studios in Oberst's native Omaha, Nebraska, with the recording process taking just two days. The album was engineered by Ben Brodin, mixed by Mike Mogis and mastered by Bob Ludwig.

Described as an acoustic album, the songs on the album solely feature Oberst and consist of vocals, acoustic guitar, piano, and harmonica. In a press release, Oberst described Ruminations''' inception: All ten main tracks and five bonus tracks were re-recorded with a full band for Oberst's following album Salutations''.

Artwork
The album artwork features a photograph captured by Julia Brokaw of Oberst playing piano and harmonica with a microphone and sheet music on display, marking the album's low-production and minimal instrumentation.

Accolades

Track listing

Charts

References

Conor Oberst albums
2016 albums
Nonesuch Records albums